Mexican cook and author Josefina Velázquez de León wrote more than 140 cookbooks in her lifetime. This bibliography, which may not be complete, is based on Velázquez de León's works in the Mexican Cookbook Collection at The University of Texas at San Antonio Libraries Special Collections and works listed in WorldCat. Undated publications in this list were lacking dates in the original publication.

References 

Bibliographies of Mexican writers
Bibliographies of food and drink